The Gillig Low Floor (originally named Gillig H2000LF and also nicknamed Gillig Advantage) is a transit bus manufactured by the Gillig Corporation. The second low-floor bus introduced in the United States (after the New Flyer Low Floor), the Low Floor has been produced since 1997. Originally produced alongside the Gillig Phantom as an expansion of the transit product range, the Low Floor has become the successor to the Phantom and the sole Gillig bus platform since 2008.

The Gillig Low Floor was assembled in Hayward, California, prior to the 2017 relocation of Gillig Corporation to Livermore, California.

Design history 
The Gillig Low Floor began life in the mid-1990s as Gillig was approached by Hertz Corporation to develop a shuttle bus for its rental car parking lots at airports to replace its aging GMC RTS buses. Featuring a carpeted interior, luggage racks, and a central entry door, the primary design requirement of Hertz was a low-floor entry for those carrying luggage or with limited mobility. In 1996, the first buses for Hertz (named the Gillig H2000LF) entered production. Gillig would produce the H2000LF for Hertz through 2005, as the design was replaced by standard Gillig Low Floor buses. Hertz Corporation used the H2000LF at Logan International Airport in Boston as well as other airports in the United States.

In 1997, Gillig modified the H2000LF design for transit bus use, replacing the central entry with dual entry doors.  Renamed the Gillig Low Floor, the low-floor bus was marketed alongside the step-entrance Gillig Phantom.

During its production, the Low Floor has undergone several revisions to its body design. In 2002, the windshield was enlarged (with the use of a smaller destination sign) and the side windows were reduced in width.  After 2003, the rear side split windows that were configured upside down were reconfigured to match the rest of the side windows; frameless windows later became an option (with or without split openings).  In 2008, the glass of both entry doors was enlarged (distinguished by squared-off corners). Also in 2008, a suburban configuration was added, identified externally by the lack of a rear entry door. In place of transit seating, the suburban configuration is equipped with forward-facing seating, internal luggage racks, onboard Wi-Fi, and other passenger-related options.

A battery-electric powertrain developed by Cummins was made available for the Low Floor Plus variant starting in 2019. The launch client for the Gillig/Cummins battery-electric bus was Big Blue Bus, serving Santa Monica, California. A battery-electric Low Floor (29-foot) was tested at Altoona in 2018, using a drivetrain adapted from the BAE HybriDrive powertrain.

Overview 
Of the two body configurations for low-floor buses, the Gillig Low Floor is a low-entry bus (the front two-thirds to three-fourths of the interior is low-floor) with a low-step entry (nearly curb height) and integrated manual wheelchair ramp while the rear part of the interior (behind the rear axle) is raised to provide sufficient space for the powertrain.

Maximum seating capacity is 28 passengers for the 29-foot length (with seats over the front axle), 32 passengers for the 35-foot length, and 40 passengers for the 40-foot length.

Powertrain

Conventional (internal combustion) 
Currently (as of 2019 production), the Gillig Low Floor range is equipped with three engines: the Cummins B6.7 diesel, Cummins L9 diesel, and Cummins L9N compressed natural gas inline-six engines. Throughout its production, the Gillig Low Floor has featured a range of Cummins engines along with Caterpillar and Detroit Diesel engines.

Allison, Voith, and ZF automatic transmissions are available.

Hybrid diesel-electric 

Since 2004, the Gillig Low Floor has been available in a diesel-electric hybrid configuration with the Cummins ISB engine; hybrid models are identified by their roof-mounted battery pack. Hybrid models have been produced with Allison, BAE, and Voith series- and parallel-hybrid powertrains. In 2008, the Allison hybrid drivetrain was % more expensive than a conventional bus, which was partially subsidized by federal grants and expected savings in fuel and maintenance costs.

Battery electric 

A fully electric configuration was introduced in 2019, with serial production commencing in 2020; it was developed as a prototype at the request of Big Blue Bus, which had reduced an order of 20 CNG buses to 19 in order to test an all-electric powertrain system developed by Cummins (branded "Cummins Battery Electric System"). The buses use plug-in charging with a SAE J1772 CCS Type 1 connector, and an overhead pantograph (SAE J3105–1) connection is available.

Trolleybus 

Gillig partnered with Kiepe Electric to build 45 "NexGen" trolleybuses for the Greater Dayton Regional Transit Authority (RTA); Gillig was responsible for the chassis, based on the Low Floor BRT/CNG, and Kiepe supplied the traction motor, battery, and trolley pole equipment. This meant that buses could detour around stalled traffic and the system could be expanded without installing more overhead wire; to facilitate off-wire operation, the driver could move the poles up and down without leaving their seat. Four prototypes were supplied in 2014: two used diesel engines to operate off-wire, while the other two used storage batteries. The remaining 41 would be equipped with storage batteries; the prototypes would be tested for more than five years before the first of the 41 regular production models arrived in August 2019. The final bus was delivered in 2021.

Variants 

Gillig also manufactures four models of buses based on the Low Floor chassis: the Low Floor BRT, Low Floor BRT Plus, Low Floor Plus, and the Low Floor Trolley. All have the same engine and transmission options as the standard Low Floor.

Gillig BRT 

The Gillig BRT is a restyled version of the Low Floor with different front and rear fascias. It wears a more futuristic look than the standard model. It is available in the same lengths as the standard Low Floor model, although the front fascia adds roughly an extra foot of length to the bus.  Instead of sealed-beam headlights, the Gillig BRT has projector headlights.  The Gillig BRT is available with CNG, Diesel and Diesel-Electric Hybrid drivetrains.

Gillig BRT Plus 
The Gillig BRT Plus is a variant of the BRT which features a full-length roof fairing which hides equipment which can include A/C units, CNG fuel tanks, or batteries. The Plus made its debut in 2011 with Long Beach Transit #1201, which is also the first Compressed Natural Gas (CNG) BRT produced. The BRT Plus is available with CNG, Diesel and Diesel-Electric Hybrid drivetrains. A BRT Plus trolleybus order for the Dayton RTA's trolleybus system used Vossloh Kiepe propulsion and trolley poles.

Gillig Low Floor Plus 
The newest variant of the Gilig Low Floor. Introduced in 2017, the Low Floor Plus is more mildly restyled compared to the Gillig BRT and BRT Plus. The Low Floor Plus features the headlights of the BRT and full-length roof fairings similar to the BRTPlus, but retains the same windshield and rear end cap as the traditional Low Floor model.

Gillig Trolley Replica 

The Gillig Trolley is a trolley-replica bus produced in collaboration with Cable Car Classics of Healdsburg, California. It is available in 30, 35 and 40-foot (9.1, 10.7 and 12.2-meter) lengths. The vintage-style trolley appearance package exterior features include frameless bonded side windows, maintenance-free wood-like trim, ornate gold pinstriping, custom window and body graphic decals, roof cupola, functional solid brass bell, cow catcher, roof perimeter LED ropelights, and front center brass trolley lamp. The interior has solid American white oak seats, optional seat cushions, leather hand straps, brass handrails, stop request pull ropes, wood trim, and woodgrain wall panels and floor covering. In addition to conventional diesel, the Gillig Trolley is available with optional power trains, including Allison hybrid-electric, all-electric, and CNG.

See also 

 Gillig Phantom – Predecessor of the Gillig Low Floor
 Gillig Corporation – Manufacturer of the Gillig Low Floor
 List of buses

Competitors:
 NABI LFW
 Neoplan AN440L
 New Flyer Low Floor
 Nova Bus LF Series
 Orion VII
 Grande West Vicinity

References

External links 

Gillig Corporation, gillig.com, Retrieved on 2009-09-11
Gillig Low Floor, Gillig Low Floor, Retrieved on 2009-09-12
Gillig Hybrid, Gillig Hybrid, Retrieved on 2009-09-12
Gillig Trolley Replica, Gillig Trolley Replica, Retrieved on 2009-09-11
Gillig BRT, Gillig BRT, Retrieved on 2009-09-11

Buses of the United States
Low Floor
Hybrid electric buses
Low-floor buses
Single-deck buses
Vehicles introduced in 1996